Baduria is a city and a municipality in Basirhat subdivision of North 24 Parganas district in the Indian state of West Bengal.

Geography

Location
It has an average elevation of 8 metres (26 feet).

Area overview
The area shown in the map is a part of the Ichhamati-Raimangal Plain, located in the lower Ganges Delta. It contains soil of mature black or brownish loam to recent alluvium. Numerous rivers, creeks and khals criss-cross the area. The tip of the Sundarbans National Park is visible in the lower part of the map (shown in green but not marked). The larger full screen map shows the full forest area. A large section of the area is a part of the Sundarbans settlements. The densely populated area is an overwhelmingly rural area. Only 12.96% of the population lives in the urban areas and 87.04% of the population lives in the rural areas.

Note: The map alongside presents some of the notable locations in the subdivision. All places marked in the map are linked in the larger full screen map.

Civic administration
The headquarters of Baduria CD Block at Iswarigachha are located just outside the municipal limits of Buduria town.

Police station
Baduria police station covers an area of 218 km2 and serves a population of 305,000. It has jurisdiction over Baduria municipal area and Baduria CD Block. It has two outposts: Baduria town outpost and Puro outpost. There is a totally unfenced international border stretching across 2.5 km.

Demographics
According to the 2011 Census of India, Baduria had a total population of 52,493, of which 26,799 (51%) were males and 25,694 (49%) were females. Population in the age range 0-6 years was 5,185. The total number of literate persons in Baduria was 38,770 (81.95% of the population over 6 years).

 India census, Baduria had a population of 47,418. Males constitute 51% of the population and females 49%. Baduria has an average literacy rate of 67%, higher than the national average of 59.5%; with 55% of the males and 45% of females literate. 13% of the population is under 6 years of age.

Transport
State Highway 3 (locally known as Habra-Baisrhat Road) passes through Baduria.

Education
Baduria Dilip Kumar Memorial Institution (co-educational), Baduria L.M.S. High School (co-educational) and Baduria L.M.S. Girls High School (girls only) are higher secondary schools located in Baduria.

Healthcare
Rudrapur (Baduria) Rural Hospital with 60 beds functions as the main medical facility in Baduria CD Block. There are primary health centres at Dakshin Chatra (with 6 beds), Jadurhati (with 6 beds), and Model Belghoria (Bajitpur PHC with 10 beds).

See also

 2017 Baduria riots

Baduria picture gallery

References

Cities and towns in North 24 Parganas district
Cities in West Bengal